Bardhyl is a Pagan Albanian masculine given name meaning White star, reflected from the Illyrian name Bardylis - both of astrolatrical origins. It has become more popular during the communist rule of Albania, serving as a more atheistic, and nationalistic identification, and is usually held by Albanian atheists. Bardhyl is ranked as the 37321st most popular given name in the United States with an estimated population of 107.

Origin 
The name Bardhyl is thought to be of ancient origins, stemming back to the kingdom of Dardania. The oldest attested variant of Bardhyl is Bardylis from the 4th century bc. King Bardylis of Dardania is considered the Founder of the kingdom of Dardania and its first king.

The name was again carried out by Bardylis grandson, Bardylis II, son of the former king of kingdom of Dardania, Cleitus, who ruled from c. 295 - c. 290 bc. Both were enemies of the Kingdom of Macedonia.

The name is also found in the animal kingdom, Bardylis (wasp)

Etymology 
Pavle Ivić and Alexandru Rosetti have connected the name Bardylis with Albanian i bardhë "white", while another opinion explains the name as a combination of i bardhë with Albanian yll "star". According to Stuart Edward Mann, this second version is a folk etymology. According to German linguist Paul Kretschmer the name Bardylis is connected with the word "bardulos", which according to him means "grey" in the language of the Messapii in southern Italy.
It is connected to Albanian Mythology, to one of the Albanian names of god, hyj. The word hyj derives from the archaic for star hyll, and is probably the namesake of the term Illyria. The Albanian word may be cognate to Messapic anthroponym Barzidihi, both stemming from the same source, since Albanian and Messapic are thought to share a closer proximity than other Indo-European languages.

Persons with the name Bardhyl

Bardhyl, Bardhyll, Bardhill, bardhull  and other variants are more popularily held by irreligious Albanian. including these notable personalities: 
Bardylis king of Dardania
Bardylis II Grandson of Bardylis
Bardhyl Ajeti Albanian journalist
Bardhyl Demiraj Albanian albanologist
Bardhyl Kollçaku Albanian Chief of Defence
Bardhyl Çaushi  Kosovo Albanian human rights lawyer and activist

See also
Gjokë

References

Albanian masculine given names
Albanian-language surnames